Governor Mechem may refer to:

Edwin L. Mechem (1912–2002), Governor of New Mexico
Merritt C. Mechem (1870–1946), Governor of New Mexico

See also
Evan Mecham (1924–2008), Governor of Arizona